Piotr Grudziński (15 March 1975, Warsaw – 21 February 2016, Warsaw), was a Polish musician, mostly recognized as guitarist of Riverside. He has also contributed to bands such as Unnamed and Groan.

Grudziński joined Riverside in 2001. He recorded six studio albums with the band: Out of Myself (2003), Second Life Syndrome (2005), Rapid Eye Movement (2007), Anno Domini High Definition (2009), Shrine of New Generation Slaves (2013), Love, Fear and the Time Machine (2015).

Equipment
Piotr Grudziński was endorsed by Mayones model Setius PRO and Regius Gothic. He was also using Ibanez Jem 777 BK, Ibanez RG-470, Mesa Boogie Stereo Simul Class 2:Ninety, Marshall JMP 1-Preamp, Marshall 4x12 Cabinet 1960 AV, Mark L Midi Control System FC-25, Mark L Midi Loop & Switch LS-14, Mark L Duo Stereo Line Mixer, Mark L Power Station, ISP Decima Tor Pro Rack G, TC Electronic Stereo Reverb M 2000, Eventide Time Factor, Eventide Mod Factor, Eventide Pitch Factor, Mark L Jazz Drive, Mark L Vanilla Sky, Ibanez ts808 Mod by Mark L, MXR 10 band EQ, 2 x Ernie Ball Volume Pedal, Boss Tu-2 Tuner, Ernie Ball Tuner, Mogami Cables.

Death
Piotr Grudziński died on 21 February 2016 due to a pulmonary embolism. He was buried at the Northern Communal Cemetery in Warsaw.

Discography

References

External links 

 Riverside homepage

1975 births
2016 deaths
21st-century guitarists
21st-century male musicians
Polish male guitarists
Musicians from Warsaw
Polish heavy metal guitarists
Progressive metal guitarists